Chrystiano Gomes Ferraz (born 6 December 1986), nicknamed Chrys, is a Brazilian professional football  player who plays as a midfielder or striker. Chrys is currently playing for Clube Atlético Metropolitano.
Mestre e doutorando em Teologia pela Pontifícia Universidade Católica do Rio de Janeiro, na área de Teologia Sistemática, Bacharel em Teologia pelo Seminário Teológico Batista do Sul do Brasil. Licenciado em Filosofia (Centro Universitário Claretiano) e pós-graduado em Filosofia pela Universidade Cândido Mendes (UCAM). Especialista em Coordenação Pedagógica pela Faculdade Católica Paulista - UCA e especialista em Administração Escolar pela Universidade Cândido Mendes (UCAM). Atualmente é diretor geral da instituição de ensino Recreio Christian School (Unidade Campo Grande), professor de Filosofia, Sociologia e Bíblia (Ensino Médio) e pastor batista. Tem experiência na área de Educação, com ênfase em Educação Religiosa e Filosofia. Pesquisador na área de Diálogo Inter-religioso e Ecumênico, Teologia Latino-americana, Ecoteologia, Sociologia da Religião e História do Cristianismo. Prêmio Vozes Acadêmica 2020 e publicação na Série Teologia da Editora Vozes/PUC-Rio.

He previously played for Brazilian clubs Fluminense, Flamengo, América, and Madureira Esporte Clube. He played some matches for Brazil U-15, U-16 and U-17.. He has also played abroad with Aalborg Boldspilklub in the Danish Superliga and for Greek club Ethnikos Piraeus.

References

External links
 Profile at sambafoot.com
 AaB profile
 Danish Superliga statistics

1986 births
Living people
Brazilian expatriate footballers
AaB Fodbold players
Madureira Esporte Clube players
Ethnikos Piraeus F.C. players
Danish Superliga players
Expatriate men's footballers in Denmark
Tupi Football Club players
Association football midfielders
Footballers from Rio de Janeiro (city)
Brazilian footballers